The New York State Department of Financial Services (DFS or NYSDFS) is the department of the New York state government responsible for regulating financial services and products, including those subject to the New York insurance, banking and financial services laws.

History
As part of the 2011 state budget, Governor Andrew M. Cuomo and the New York State Legislature consolidated the New York State Insurance Department and New York State Banking Department and created the New York State Department of Financial Services effective October 3, 2011.  The purpose of consolidating the agencies and creating the Department of Financial Services was to modernize regulation by allowing the agency to oversee a broader array of financial products and services.

Mission
The mission of the department, according to its website, is to:  foster the growth of the financial industry in New York and spur state economic development through judicious regulation and vigilant supervision; ensure the continued solvency, safety, soundness and prudent conduct of the providers of financial products and services; ensure fair, timely and equitable fulfillment of the financial obligations of such providers; protect users of financial products and services from financially impaired or insolvent providers of such services; encourage high standards of honesty, transparency, fair business practices and public responsibility; eliminate financial fraud, other criminal abuse and unethical conduct in the industry; and educate and protect users of financial products and services and ensure that users are provided with timely and understandable information to make responsible decisions about financial products and services.

Supervision
The department supervises approximately 4400 entities, with assets of about $6.2 trillion.  These entities include:  state-chartered banks and trust companies; insurance companies; insurance producers; insurance adjusters; bail bond agents; service contracts; life settlements; budget planners; charitable foundations; check cashers; credit unions; investment companies; licensed lenders; money transmitters; mortgage bankers; mortgage brokers; mortgage loan servicers; premium finance agencies; private bankers; safe deposit companies; sales finance companies; savings banks; and savings and loans.

Leadership
The New York State Legislature unanimously confirmed Benjamin M. Lawsky on May 24, 2011, as New York State's first Superintendent of Financial Services. From May 24, 2011, until October 3, 2011, Lawsky also was appointed, and served as, Acting Superintendent of Banks for the former New York State Banking Department. As Superintendent of Banks, Lawsky led Governor Andrew M. Cuomo’s initiative to consolidate the New York State Banking Department and New York State Insurance Department towards a new financial regulator called the Department of Financial Services.

James J. Wrynn, former Superintendent of Insurance, was appointed as Deputy Superintendent of Financial Services for the Department. He left the Department in March 2012 to become a partner at Goldberg Segalla LLP.

Organization
The Department has five divisions: the insurance division; banking division, financial frauds and consumer protection division ("FFCPD"), capital markets division, and real estate division.  The insurance division has life, health, and property bureaus.  The FFCPD was created by the Financial Services Law and aims to protect and educate consumers of financial products and services.   It also aims to fight financial fraud.  The FFCPD pursues civil and criminal investigations of activities that may constitute violations of the Financial Services Law, Banking Law, Insurance Law, or other laws, and brings enforcement proceedings where appropriate.

The department also has an Office of General Counsel, which is the legal arm of the department.  It drafts legislation, regulations, and circular letters, issues legal opinions, and renders legal advice to Department staff. The current General Counsel is Richard Weber since May 1, 2020.

Offices and locations
The department's main office is in New York City at One State Street.  The department also has offices at One Commerce Plaza in Albany, 333 East Washington Street in Syracuse, 65 Court Street in Buffalo, and 163B Mineola Boulevard in Mineola.

Activities
The department's regulations are compiled in titles 3, 11, and 23 of the New York Codes, Rules and Regulations (NYCRR).

Bitcoin
In August 2013, Forbes magazine reported that the department initiated an investigation into bitcoin by issuing subpoenas to several companies and investors.

On July 17, 2014, the department released details on a proposed BitLicense, which places regulations on any company or person that uses cryptocurrencies residing in New York. The proposed regulations were officially published in the New York State Register on July 23, beginning a 45-day comment period. On February 25, 2015, a revised proposal notice was published, beginning another 30-day comment period.

Standard Chartered fined
On 19 August 2014, Standard Chartered was fined $300 million by the department for breach of money-laundering compliance related to potentially high-risk transactions involving the bank's clients in Hong Kong and the UAE. The bank issued a statement accepting responsibility and regretting the deficiencies.

Deutsche Bank fined, Again
On January 30, 2017, the New York State Department of Financial Services|NYSDFS (New York State Department of Financial Services) fined Deutsche Bank $425 million for violating New York's anti-money laundering laws.

Service Contract providers 
The DFS has the authority to license and regulate service contract providers. A list of the currently licensed service contractor providers can be found at  Currently Registered Service Contract Providers. New York State and other states, such as California, have the authority to fine or prosecute unlicensed service contract providers.

References

contractorExternal links
 
 Banking, Insurance and Financial Services in the New York Codes, Rules and Regulations

Financial Services
2011 establishments in New York (state)
Bank regulation in the United States by state
Government agencies established in 2011
Insurance in the United States